Two Headed is a 1995 album by Spirit of the West.

It is the band's darkest and heaviest album, with many songs directly addressing the subject of death. Ken Marshall, a noted Canadian producer of industrial music, produced the album, giving many songs a densely layered, textured production which results in an almost psychedelic hard rock sound.

The album reached #20 on RPM'''s Top 100 albums chart the week of July 31, 1995.

"Tell Me What I Think", the album's first single, was a notable hit, peaking at #25 on the RPM singles chart the week of August 14. The song was also released on CD single, with several remixes by Marshall. The song's video, directed by Morris Panych, was choreographed around a fixed-location camera. However, despite the song's chart success, the video became their first in many years not'' to receive significant rotation on MuchMusic.

Track listing
All songs by John Mann and Geoffrey Kelly.

"Wishing Line"  – 3:49
"Blood and Honey"  – 4:56
"Tell Me What I Think"  – 3:53
"Never Had it in Me"  – 4:25
"Scaffolding"  – 5:07
"Two Headed"  – 3:52
"Unplugged"  – 3:14
"Mildred"  – 3:37
"Pretend is Fun"  – 3:24
"Can't Accept the Saint"  – 5:22
"Pin-Up Boy"  – 4:43

References

1995 albums
Spirit of the West albums